NS19, NS 19, NS-19, NS.19, or variation, may refer to:

Places
 Toa Payoh MRT station (station code: NS19), Toa Payoh, Singapore; a mass transit station
 Dartmouth South (constituency N.S. 19), Nova Scotia, Canada; a provincial electoral district
 Wanica District (FIPS region code NS19), Suriname

Other uses
 New Penguin Shakespeare volume 19
 Blue Origin NS-19, a suborbital space tourism flight in December 2021

See also

 NS (disambiguation)
 19 (disambiguation)